The Individual large hill/10 km competition at the FIS Nordic World Ski Championships 2021 was held on 4 March 2021.

Results

Ski jumping
The ski jumping part was held at 11:00.

Cross-country skiing
The cross-country skiing part was started at 15:15.

References

Individual large hill/10 km